Jadis is the name of the White Witch in C. S. Lewis's Narnia Chronicles.

Jadis may also refer to:
Jadis (band), British neo-progressive rock group
Jadis, Iran
Jadis Township, Roseau County, Minnesota, a township in Minnesota, United States
Jadis (The Walking Dead), a character on the television series The Walking Dead
Jordan Antiquities Database and Information System (JADIS), computer database of archaeological sites in Jordan

People with the surname Jadis
Charles Newland Godfrey Jadis (1730–1788), Canadian naval officer and merchant